Vishesh Bansal (born 3 October 2004) is an Indian actor. He was brought up in Mumbai, India. He is known for portraying Harshal Gupta in Yeh Meri Family.

Career 
Bansal has acted in several shows, including the 2011 Triangle Film Company's mythological series Devon Ke Dev...Mahadev as Grihpati on Life OK, also known playing a role in 4 Lions Films romantic-drama series Iss Pyaar Ko Kya Naam Doon? as Arnav and Khushi's adopted son as Aarav Singh Raizada on Star Plus, the first season of the drama series Na Bole Tum Na Maine Kuch Kaha as Aditya Vyas, and the 2013 romance-drama series Beintehaa as Zain and Aliya's son Zayed Zain Abdullah on Colors TV.

Later he gave an audition and selected to play the main lead in mythological series Buddha. He portrayed alongside an ensemble cast, including Sameer Dharmadhikari, Nigaar Khan, Kabir Bedi, Gungun Uprari, played the role of young King Siddharth / Buddha. The story of the show is based on the life of Gautama Buddha. The show produced by B.K. Modi and was aired on Zee TV from July 2013.

Bansal also featured in a Bollywood Movie Bombay Talkies released in 2013, in a story "Sheila Ki Jawani". Directed by Zoya Akhtar, he was shown as a young boy desiring to become a policeman in future.

By the end of June 2015, Bansal featured to play the protagonist in Swastik Pictures' mythological-drama series Suryaputra Karn, in which he was cast alongside Mouli Ganguly and Anand Suryavanshi, played the lead role of a very young Karna. The show is based on the journey of the warrior Karna, one of the central character from the Mahabharata. The show was created and produced by Siddharth Kumar Tewary and it airs on Sony Entertainment Television from 29 June 2015. Later, he was replaced by Basant Bhatt after ten years leap in the show on 18 August 2015.

Filmography

Films

Television

Web series

Awards and nominations

References

External links

2004 births
Living people
Indian male television actors
Indian male child actors
21st-century Indian male child actors